The 53rd parallel north is a circle of latitude that is 53 degrees north of the Earth's equatorial plane. It crosses Europe, Asia, the Pacific Ocean, North America, and the Atlantic Ocean.

At this latitude the sun is visible for 16 hours, 56 minutes during the summer solstice and 7 hours, 34 minutes during the winter solstice. If the latitude in the northern hemisphere is 53º45′ or smaller, everyday of the month of August can view both astronomical dawn and astronomical dusk.

Around the world
Starting at the Prime Meridian (northeast of Boston, Lincolnshire, England) and heading eastwards, the parallel 53° north passes through:

See also
52nd parallel north
54th parallel north

References

n53